Thomas Ormiston (29 September 1878 – 15 January 1937) was a Scottish Unionist Party Member of Parliament (MP) who represented the Motherwell constituency from 1931 to 1935.

References

External links 
 

1878 births
1937 deaths
Unionist Party (Scotland) MPs
UK MPs 1931–1935